Semnoderidae is a family of worms belonging to the class Cyclorhagida.

Genera:
 Parasemnoderes Adrianov & Maiorova, 2018
 Semnoderes Zelinka, 1907
 Sphenoderes Higgins, 1969

References

Kinorhyncha